Xerotricha apicina is a species of small air-breathing land snail, a terrestrial pulmonate gastropod mollusk in the family Geomitridae.

References

 Gittenberger, E. (1991). On Cyprian Helicellinae (Mollusca: Gastropoda Pulmonata: Helicidae), making a new start. Zoologische Mededelingen, 65 (7): 99-128. Leiden
 Bank, R. A.; Neubert, E. (2017). Checklist of the land and freshwater Gastropoda of Europe. Last update: July 16th, 2017

External links
 AnimalBase info
 Lamarck, [J.-B. M. de. (1822). Histoire naturelle des animaux sans vertèbres. Tome sixième, 2me partie. Paris: published by the Author, 232 pp]
 Mabille, J. (1898). Notitiae malacologicae. Bulletin de la Société Philomathique de Paris. (8) 9 (2)
 Sparacio, I., Surdo, S., Viviano, R., Liberto, F. & Reitano, A. (2021). Land molluscs from the Isola delle Femmine Nature Reserve (north-western Sicily, Italy) (Gastropoda Architaenioglossa Pulmonata). Biodiversity Journal. 12 (3): 589–624
 Groh, K. (2012). Bibliography of the land and freshwater molluscs of the Cape Verde Islands, with a historical synopsis of malacological exploration in the archipelago and an annotated check-list. Zoologia Caboverdiana. 3 (1): 37-51

Geomitridae
Gastropods described in 1822